Bikapur is a constituency of the Uttar Pradesh Legislative Assembly covering the city of Bikapur in the Faizabad district of Uttar Pradesh, India.

Bikapur is one of five assembly constituencies in the Faizabad Lok Sabha constituency. Since 2008, this assembly constituency is numbered 274 amongst 403 constituencies.

Election results

2022 

 

Samajwadi Party candidate "Firoz Khan" received 42.04% (101,708) votes, 11.79 from 2017.

2022
Bharatiya Janta Party candidate Amit Singh Chauhan won in 2022 Uttar Pradesh Legislative Elections defeating Samajwadi Party candidate Firoz Khan Urf Gabbar by a margin of 5560 votes.

References

External links
 

Assembly constituencies of Uttar Pradesh
Faizabad district